HMS Daedalus was a nineteenth-century warship of the Royal Navy. She was launched as a fifth-rate frigate of 46 guns of the Modified  in 1826, but never commissioned in that role, being roofed over fore and aft and then laid up in Ordinary (reserve). After spending 18 years laid up in reserve, she was raséed (cut down) at Woolwich Dockyard into a corvette, reduced to 19 guns in 1844.

On 6 August 1848, Captain McQuhae of Daedalus and several of his officers and crew (en route to St Helena) saw a sea serpent which was subsequently reported (and debated) in The Times. The vessel sighted what they named as an enormous serpent between the Cape of Good Hope and St Helena. Captain McQuahae also reported that the creature was dark brown and had a yellowish white colour around its throat and was moving between 19 or 24 Kilometers per hour. Captain McQuahae also said that "The creature passed rapidly, but so close under our lee quarter, that had it been a man of my acquaintance I should have easily have recognised his features with the naked eye." According to seven members of the crew it remained in view for around twenty minutes. Another officer wrote that the creature was more of a lizard than a serpent. in 2015 evolutionary biologist Gary J Galbreath contended that what the crew of Daedalus saw was a sei whale.

In 1853, Daedalus was laid up at Plymouth Dockyard. Between March and June 1851 she was fitted out as a training ship, and transferred to the Royal Naval Reserve as a drill ship at Bristol. She was finally paid off from this role in September 1910, and sold in 1911 at Bristol to take to pieces.

Portrayal in popular fiction 

 Matthew Willis, Daedalus and the Deep (2013)

References 

 "Big eels and little eels" in Eagle Annual 1968, Oldhams books limited, Holland, 1967, p 118.
 "Don't Shoot the Albatros!: Nautical Myths and Superstitions" by Jonathan Eyers, A&C Black, London, UK, 2011, p 87.
 Mid-Victorian ships of the Royal Navy
 The Sail and Steam Navy List: All the Ships of the Royal Navy 1815–1889 Rif Winfield and David Lyon. Chatham Publishing, 2004. .                                                                                                                                 
 https://skepticalinquirer.org/2015/09/the-1848-enormous-serpent-of-the-daedalus-identified/

Further reading
 Gleason's Pictorial, 1852

External links
 
 

Leda-class frigates
1826 ships
Fifth-rate frigates of the Royal Navy